Garry Robbins (September 9, 1957 – December 11, 2013) was a Canadian actor and professional wrestler.

Early life 
Robbins was born in St. Catharines, Ontario, Canada in 1957.

Acting career 
Robbins was discovered working as a bouncer in a local bar and went on to act in his first feature film, Humongous. In Wrong Turn, he played one of three disfigured brothers in the West Virginia mountains. With makeup and prosthetics by Stan Winston, he portrayed the character "Saw Tooth".

Professional wrestling career 
Robbins wrestled all over the world, including for many promotions across Canada, for Global Wrestling Federation in the United States, for New Japan in Japan, for World Wrestling Council in Puerto Rico and for Indo-Asian Wrestling in India. While in Japan he often worked tag team bouts teaming with Demolition Ax as "Demolition Hux". He was also a stuntman, stunt coordinator, voiceover artist and bodyguard.

Death 
Robbins died of a heart attack at the age of 56 on December 11, 2013.

Filmography

Movies

Television

References

External links 
 
 
 

1957 births
2013 deaths
Canadian male film actors
Canadian male television actors
Canadian male professional wrestlers
Male actors from Ontario
Professional wrestlers from Ontario
Sportspeople from St. Catharines